Boclair Academy, a  co-educational  comprehensive secondary school located in the Greater Glasgow suburb of Bearsden, East Dunbartonshire, Scotland, serves pupils aged 11 to 18 from Southern Bearsden, Westerton and Torrance.  Boclair Academy is affiliated with four local primary schools within its catchment area: Westerton Primary School, Killermont Primary School, Colquhoun Park Primary School and Torrance Primary School. The school's exam achievement has improved in recent years: in 2011 27% of  S5 gained at least 5 Higher passes (A-C), ranking Boclair 11th in Scotland for a state school.

History and recent upgrades

Boclair Academy was built in 1976 to meet increased demand in the area; initially the school accommodated overflow with Douglas Academy and Bearsden Academy but later the school had an increased number of placing requests from outside East Dunbartonshire. In 1998, because the school was over capacity, an annexe was erected for the Maths department.

In June 2016, Rangers F.C. announced a partnership with East Dunbartonshire Council which saw 24 of the club's youth players aged 11 to 15 attend Boclair Academy to allow them to combine their academic and football studies. The school is located close to the Rangers training ground at Auchenhowie.

The School is also set to move into a new building situated on the rugby pitch of the old school building at the start of the 2022-2023 academic year

HMIe inspection
The school's last inspection was carried out in January 2009 by Her Majesty's Inspectorate of Education (merged in 2011 with Learning and Teaching Scotland to form Education Scotland). The report, published 17 March 2009, was largely positive and praised the following strengths:
 Positive relationships between staff and young people
 Enthusiastic, well-motivated and friendly young people
 High-quality learning and teaching in all departments
 Consistently high attainment in national examinations
 Effective partnership working to support young people with additional support needs
 Effective pastoral support for young people moving from primary school into S1, particularly for those most likely to find the move difficult.

HMIe also agreed the following areas for improvement with the school and education
authority:

 Continue to improve learning and teaching by better sharing of good practice and through more effective self-evaluation
 Continue to improve achievement by building more effectively on young people's learning at primary school and through better links with community partners.

The inspection of the school was accompanied by an inspection of the learning community surrounding Boclair Academy. There was also a follow through report, which evaluated the school's progress, published by East Dunbartonshire Council in February 2011.

The following is according to the 'student planner' 2013–2014 issued to all pupils (see Bibliography below)

Departmental facilities and equipment

Physical education

The PE department has a swimming pool.  It also has a variety of equipment to cater for sporting activities within two games halls (used for gymnastics, circuit training, social dance, badminton, basketball, football, and indoor games such as Danish Longball) and an outside area consisting of two all-weather pitches for football and hockey, two grass rugby pitches, and spare grass areas used for football. In the PE building upstairs there is a fitness room.

RMPS
The Religious, Moral and Philosophical Studies department runs a chess club and a debating society which has produced finalists in the Junior English-Speaking Union Scotland debating competition and more recently semi-finalists in the Law Society of Scotland Donald Dewar Memorial Competition.

In the news

The Evening Times reported on a pupil beating the UK Pi memorising record (12 May 2008).
The BBC reported on a technician being injured following an explosion in the school laboratory (23 June 2009).

Popular culture

The school building has been used for several sketches in the second series of Burnistoun. (see Bibliography below)

Notable alumni

 Tommy Reilly, musician, the winner of Orange Unsigned Act 2008, was a pupil at the school until 2007.

References

Bibliography
 "Episode 3", Burnistoun Series 2, BBC One, television, First Broadcast 18 April 2011.
 Boclair Academy School Handbook 2012–2013
 Boclair Academy Student Planner 2012–2013

External links

Boclair's page on Scottish Schools Online
East Dunbartonshire Council

Secondary schools in East Dunbartonshire
Educational institutions established in 1978
Bearsden
1978 establishments in Scotland